John Benjamin Ireland (January 30, 1914 – March 21, 1992) was a Canadian actor. He was nominated for an Academy Award for his performance in All the King's Men (1949), making him the first Vancouver-born actor to receive an Oscar nomination.

Ireland was a supporting actor in several Western films such as My Darling Clementine (1946), Red River (1948), Vengeance Valley (1951), and Gunfight at the O.K. Corral (1957). His other film roles include A Walk in the Sun (1945), Joan Of Arc (1948), Spartacus (1960), 55 Days at Peking (1963), The Fall of the Roman Empire (1964), The Adventurers (1970), and Farewell, My Lovely (1975).

Ireland also appeared in many television series, notably The Cheaters (1960–62). He was given a star on the Hollywood Walk of Fame for his contribution to the television industry.

Early life
Ireland was born in Vancouver, British Columbia on January 30, 1914. He lived in New York City from a very early age. Ireland's formal education ended at the 7th grade, and he worked to help his family make ends meet.

He never knew his natural father; his mother, a Scottish piano teacher Gracie Ferguson, remarried to Michael Noone, an Irish vaudevillian, and had three other children, a daughter Kathryn, a son named Tommy (the future actor-comedian Tommy Noonan), and another son, Michael. Their last name was Noone; Ireland never knew for sure where his last name came from. One of his jobs was in a water carnival where he wrestled a dead octopus.

He was a swimmer, once competing with Johnny Weissmuller. He performed underwater stunts at a carnival and worked as a barker.

Career

Theatre
One day he was passing the Davenport Free Theater in Manhattan. He entered, thinking it offered a free show and instead received free training. He slept in a dressing room and was paid a dollar a day to work backstage while rehearsing lines. 

In 1941 he made his Broadway debut in a production of Macbeth with Maurice Evans and Judith Anderson. Other Broadway plays followed.

20th Century Fox
Ireland signed with 20th Century Fox and made his screen-debut as Private Windy, the thoughtful letter-writing GI, in the 1945 war film A Walk in the Sun, directed by Lewis Milestone.

This was followed by Wake Up and Dream (1946); Behind Green Lights (1946) with Carole Landis; and It Shouldn't Happen to a Dog (1946), again with Landis. He played Billy Clanton in John Ford's My Darling Clementine (1946).

Freelance actor and Red River
Ireland had his first lead role in Railroaded! (1947), directed by Anthony Mann for Eagle-Lion. He went back to support parts for The Gangster (1947) for the King Brothers and I Love Trouble (1948) for Columbia.

Ireland played the lead in Open Secret (1948) for Eagle-Lion, then had a support role in Anthony Mann's classic noir, Raw Deal (1948).

Ireland had a vital support part in Howard Hawks' 1948 film Red River as the gunslinger Cherry Valance. However, Ireland's part was reduced when Hawks became annoyed with the actor.  Ireland was an army captain in the Ingrid Bergman spectacular, Joan of Arc (1948).

All the King's Men
In April 1948 Ireland signed a contract with Columbia Pictures at $500 a week going up to $1500 a week. Ireland was nominated for an Oscar as Best Supporting Actor for his powerful performance as Jack Burden, the hard-boiled newspaper reporter who evolves from devotee to cynical denouncer of demagogue Willie Stark (Broderick Crawford) in All the King's Men (1949), making him the first Vancouver-born actor to receive an Academy Award nomination.

Ireland was featured as Bob Ford in the low budget I Shot Jesse James (1949) the first movie directed by Sam Fuller. He was a villain in the Western Roughshod (1949) and a love rival for Paulette Goddard in Anna Lucasta (1949).

In December 1949 Columbia suspended him after walking out after filming one scene on One Way Out (released as Convicted). He sued the studio.

Lippert Pictures gave him the lead in The Return of Jesse James (1950) and he appeared opposite his then-wife Joanne Dru in support parts in Vengeance Valley (1951)

During McCarthyism in the early 50s, he successfully sued two television producers for breach of contract and slander, claiming that they reneged on roles promised to him due to his perceived political undesirability, including the lead in a TV series The Adventures of Ellery McQueen. He received an undisclosed but "substantial" cash settlement.

Ireland had the leads in some low-budget films: The Basketball Fix (1951); The Scarf (1951); Little Big Horn (1951); The Bushwackers (1952); and Hannah Lee (1953) with his wife. He directed the latter. That film resulted in a lawsuit against the producers.

He went to England to make The Good Die Young (1954) and supported his wife in Southwest Passage (1954) and Joan Crawford in Queen Bee (1955).

Director
John Ireland turned director with The Fast and the Furious (1954), an early production from Roger Corman; Ireland also starred. He had the lead in the British thriller The Glass Cage (1955) and the war film Hell's Horizon (1955). He made another for Corman, this time only as an actor – Gunslinger (1956).

In July 1955 he signed a contract with Revue to act and direct films for television.

In January 1956 he signed to play the lead in the TV series Port of Call.

Ireland landed a supporting role as Johnny Ringo in Gunfight at the O.K. Corral (1957), and played a mobster in MGM's Party Girl (1958). He had the lead in No Place to Land (1958), and Stormy Crossing (1958).

In 1959, Ireland appeared as Chris Slade, with Karl Swenson as Ansel Torgin, in the episode "The Fight Back" of the NBC western series, Riverboat. In the storyline, Tom Fowler (Tom Laughlin), the boss of the corrupt river town of Hampton near Vicksburg, Mississippi, blocks farmers from shipping their crops to market. In a dispute over a wedding held on the Enterprise, a lynch-mob led by Fowler comes after series lead-character Grey Holden (Darren McGavin). Karl Swenson also was cast in this episode.

1960s
In 1959, John guest-appeared on Judy Garland's album, The Letter for Capitol Records.

Ireland had a key role as the gladiator Crixus in the Stanley Kubrick 1960 spectacle Spartacus, co-starring with Kirk Douglas. That year he starred as Winch in the western series Rawhide episode "Incident of the Garden of Eden" and made Faces in the Dark (1960) in England. He also appeared in the Thriller TV series (1960) episode "Papa Benjamin."

From 1960 to 1962, he starred in the British television series The Cheaters, playing John Hunter, a claims investigator for an insurance company who tracked down cases of fraud. He supported Elvis Presley in Wild in the Country (1961) and had the lead in the British Return of a Stranger (1961).

In 1962, he portrayed the character Frank Trask in the episode "Incident of the Portrait" on Rawhide. Rawhide, S7, EP28 Air date: May 7, 1965, THE SPANISH CAMP" A group of men led by Dr. John Merritt (John Ireland) searching for old Spanish treasure stubbornly refuses to let the cattle drive come through the area of their diggings, even though the herd desperately needs the water in the area.

He had a supporting part in 55 Days at Peking (1963) with Charlton Heston and was Ballomar in The Fall of the Roman Empire (1964), both films shot in Spain by producer Samuel Bronston.

By the mid-1960s, he was seen as the star of B-movies, such as I Saw What You Did with Crawford. In 1965, he played role of Jed Colby, a trail scout in the final season of Rawhide. In 1966 he starred in the episode "Stage Stop" (S12E10) as abusive husband and stage coach robbery collaborator  "Jeb Coombs" on Gunsmoke.

In 1967, he appeared as Marshal Will Rimbau on Bonanza with Michael Landon in the episode "Judgment at Red Creek". A few years later, he again appeared with Landon on two episodes of Little House on the Prairie as a drunk who saves Carrie Ingalls, who had fallen down an abandoned mine shaft in season 3 episode "Little Girl Lost" and season 5 episode "The Winoka Warriors".

He had some leads in the A. C. Lyles Western Fort Utah (1967), then traveled to Europe to appear in Hate for Hate (1967), and Pistol for a Hundred Coffins (1967) and supported in Villa Rides (1968), Trusting Is Good... Shooting Is Better (1969), One on Top of the Other (1969), and Carnal Circuit (1969).

1970s
In 1970, Ireland appeared as Kinroy in the TV western The Men From Shiloh (rebranded name for The Virginian) in the episode titled "Jenny". Ireland was seen in productions like The House of Seven Corpses (1974), Salon Kitty (1976) and Satan's Cheerleaders (1977). He did, however, also appear in big-budget fare such as The Adventurers (1970), also as a police lieutenant in the Robert Mitchum private-eye story Farewell, My Lovely (1975).

Later career
He starred in Thunder Run (1986), an American action-thriller film directed by Gary Hudson and co-starring Forrest Tucker.

In 1987, he put an ad in the newspapers stating "I'm an actor... let me act." It led to a role as Jonathan Aaron Cartwright, the younger brother of Ben Cartwright, in the television movie Bonanza: The Next Generation.

He was seen in the War of the Worlds episode "Eye for an Eye" in 1988.

Ireland regularly returned to the stage throughout his career and co-directed two features in the 1950s: the acclaimed Western drama Hannah Lee (1953) and the carjacking B-movie The Fast and the Furious (1955).

Personal life

Occasionally Ireland's name was mentioned in tabloids of the times, in connection with much younger starlets, including Natalie Wood, Barbara Payton, and Sue Lyon. He attracted controversy by dating 16-year-old actress Tuesday Weld when he was 45. Ireland also had an affair with co-star Joan Crawford while on the set of Queen Bee (1955). A decade later, Ireland and Crawford co-starred again in William Castle's movie I Saw What You Did.

He was married three times. His first wife, from 1940 to 1949, was Elaine Sheldon, by whom he had two sons, John and Peter.

From 1949 to 1957, he was married to actress Joanne Dru (whose younger brother, entertainer Peter Marshall, was originally best known for his comedy act with Ireland's half-brother Tommy Noonan). In July 1956, Dru was admitted to hospital with a black eye which she said was accidental but which commonly was believed to have been caused by Ireland. Ireland later was admitted to hospital for taking an overdose of barbiturates.

When the couple divorced in 1957 they had over $50,000 in debts.

From 1962 until his death, Ireland was married to Daphne Myrick Cameron, with whom he had a daughter named Daphne and a son named Cameron. He has four grandchildren: Pete, Melissa, Jack and Helios.

In his later years, he owned the restaurant Ireland's in Santa Barbara, California. An accomplished chef, he regularly worked in the kitchen and concocted Ireland Stew, combining whatever ingredients were available on a given night. He was also a regular at the restaurant's bar, greeting patrons and buying drinks for friends.

The restaurant failed. In May 1977, Ireland declared bankruptcy.

On March 21, 1992, Ireland died in Santa Barbara, California of leukemia at the age of 78. He is buried at the Santa Barbara Cemetery.

For his contribution to the television industry, he was commemorated with a star on the Hollywood Walk of Fame at 1610 Vine Street.

Filmography

References

External links

1914 births
1992 deaths
Film directors from Vancouver
Male actors from Vancouver
Canadian male film actors
Canadian male television actors
Canadian male voice actors
Canadian male stage actors
American male film actors
American male television actors
American male voice actors
American male stage actors
Deaths from leukemia
Male Western (genre) film actors
Canadian emigrants to the United States
Deaths from cancer in California
Male Spaghetti Western actors
20th-century American male actors
20th-century Canadian male actors
Burials at Santa Barbara Cemetery